Jasial is a village and union council, an administrative subdivision, of Talagang District in the Punjab Province of Pakistan, it is part of [[Talagang District 
 & Tehsil]] and is located at 33°1'40N 72°23'34E.
'

Schools 
 GOVT.BOYS HIGH SCHOOL JASIAL
 GOVT.GIRLS HIGH SCHOOL JASIAL
 HIRA PUBLIC SCHOOL JASIAL
 FATIMA PUBLIC SCHOOL JASIAL
 Awan Public School

Mosques
MARKAZI JAMIA MASJID JASIAL
MADINAH MASJID JASIAL
FAROOQIA MASJID JASIAL
BANO VALI MASJID
JAMIA MASJID TOUHIDIA
HIGH SCHOOL MASJID
MASJID E QUBAH
DARUL UL ISLAM

Dohk
 Chokyra No. 2
 Dhok Shahbaz
 Dhok jhlar
 Dhok ladra 
 Dhok murtaza
 Dok baza
 Dhok Qazi

Towers
 Mobilink Tower
 U fone Tower
 PTCL Tower
 Zong Tower

References

Union councils of Chakwal District
Populated places in Chakwal District